The Dayton Motor Car Company Historic District, in Dayton, Ohio, is a  historic district which was listed on the National Register of Historic Places in 1984.  The listing included 12 contributing buildings.

It includes properties at 15, 101,123-5 Bainbridge; 9-111 and 122-124 McDonough, in Dayton, including at least one dating back to 1873.

References

National Register of Historic Places in Montgomery County, Ohio
Buildings and structures completed in 1873